George Albert Hall (16 April 1880 – 22 August 1954) was an Australian rules footballer who played with St Kilda in the Victorian Football League (VFL).

References

External links 

1880 births
1954 deaths
Australian rules footballers from Victoria (Australia)
St Kilda Football Club players
Yarrawonga Football Club players